Murder in Alabama constitutes the intentional killing, under circumstances defined by law, of people within or under the jurisdiction of the U.S. state of Alabama.

The United States Centers for Disease Control and Prevention reported that in the year 2020, Alabama had the third-highest rate of homicides in the country.

Felony murder rule
In Alabama, the common law felony murder rule has been codified in Alabama Code § 13A-6-2(a)(3).  It provides that when a person commits various crimes and "in the course of and in furtherance of the crime" another is killed, then the perpetrator is guilty of murder, a "Class A Felony", the punishment of which is not less than 10 years nor more than 99 years in prison, or life in prison. If any aggravating circumstances were present, the penalty is death or life imprisonment.

Penalties

Source:

References

Murder in Alabama
Alabama law
U.S. state criminal law